Utsira is a small islet in the western part of Thousand Islands, an island group south of Edgeøya. It is named after an island in Norway.

References 
 Norwegian Polar Institute Place Names of Svalbard Database

Islands of Svalbard